Nations Fresh Foods is an independently owned multi-cultural grocery store chain in Ontario, Canada, founded on August 28, 2012, in Woodbridge, Ontario. The chain has 4 stores; the first store was opened in Woodbridge, Ontario on August 28, 2012. Its second store was opened in Hamilton, Ontario, in Lloyd D. Jackson Square on July 13, 2013, the third store opened in Mississauga, Ontario on February 1, 2017, and the fourth store, considered as their flagship store was opened on November 16, 2017, in Toronto, at the Stock Yards Village mall, inside a former Target Canada location which contains an indoor playground and an arcade in addition to the usual grocery store and food offerings. Each store has groceries that are mainly imported from Asia along with groceries from other countries as well, plus the usual grocery items that are found in other stores. Nations Fresh Foods also provide food dining at all of its stores; the Woodbridge location has a hot bar, the Hamilton location has a Buffet, Hot Bar, Coffee Bar, and Pho Restaurant, and the Mississauga and Toronto flagship locations both have Hot Bar, Juice/Bubble Tea bar, Sushi/Dim Sum bar, Chinese BBQ station, and North American food. Nations' parent company, Oceans Fresh Group, also owns Oceans Fresh Foods Market stores, an affiliated chain of stores. According to the company, Nations are considered " a new, higher-end, banner store". The head office of the parent company is located in Mississauga, Ontario. In total, the parent company owns 8 stores, ( 4 Nations Fresh Foods stores, 3 Oceans Fresh Foods Market stores, and 1 Grant's Foodmart store, another affiliate chain. 2 of the stores are located in Brampton, Ontario, 3 in Mississauga, Ontario, along with the head office, 1 in Vaughan, Ontario, 1 in Hamilton, Ontario, and 1 in Toronto, Ontario.

References

2012 establishments in Ontario
Companies based in Ontario